Ljupka Dimitrovska (25 July 1946 – 3 October 2016) was a Macedonian-born Croatian singer. Internationally, she was best known for "Adio", written by Nikica Kalogjera and Ivica Krajač, which won the first prize at the 1970 Athens pop song festival. She died in Zagreb, aged 70.

Career
Dimitrovska's version of "Aido" was released in Greece on the Music Box label.

References

1946 births
2016 deaths
20th-century Croatian women singers
Croatian people of Macedonian descent
Yugoslav women singers
Musicians from Skopje
Croatian pop singers